Jay Peter Darlington (born 3 May 1968 in Sidcup, London) is an English keyboardist, best known as a member of Kula Shaker. He went on to work as a touring member of Oasis and is currently a member of the Totnes, Devon based prog band, Magic Bus.

History
Darlington attended Oxted County Senior School in Oxted, Surrey, England. He joined Kula Shaker as an organ player in 1994 and stayed with the band until their split in 1999. He didn't re-join the band when they reformed in 2004.

In 2002, Darlington joined Oasis as a live keyboardist. He toured with the band up until their last tour in the summer of 2009. Noel Gallagher would often introduce Darlington as "The Shroud", or more popularly, "Jesus Christ", a reference to Darlington's hair and facial hair. This led to chants of "Jesus, Jesus, Jesus ..." at the later concerts. In the Lord Don't Slow Me Down film's commentary, Gallagher refers to him as "Gandalf".

Since Oasis split up, Darlington has taken part in a Les Fleur de Lys reunion gig, and joined prog band Magic Bus.

In 2014, Darlington presented "The Psychedelic Shed Radio Show" on Mixcloud.

Discography

Kula Shaker
 K (1996)
 Summer Sun EP (1997)
 Peasants, Pigs and Astronauts (1999)

Oasis
 iTunes Live: London Festival (2009)
 Dig Out Your Soul (2008) - on the track "Falling Down"

Magic Bus
 Magic Bus (2010)
 Transmission from Sogmore's Garden (2014)
 Phillip The Egg (2017)

References

1968 births
Living people
English rock keyboardists
People from Sidcup
Britpop musicians
Musicians from London